Wild Together is an extended play by American country music group Carter's Chord. It was released on May 24, 2011 by Show Dog-Universal Music as the follow-up to Carter Chord's 2008 debut album, Carter's Chord.

Track listing

Personnel

Carter's Chord
 Becky Robertson - vocals
 Emily Robertson - vocals
 Joanna Robertson - vocals

Additional Musicians
 Tom Bukovac - electric guitar
 Chad Cromwell - drums
 Eric Darken - percussion
 Kevin "Swine" Grantt - bass guitar, tic tac bass
 Kenny Greenburg - electric guitar
 Aubrey Haynie - fiddle
 Jim Hoke - acoustic guitar, lap steel guitar
 Phil Madiera - keyboards, piano
 Steve Nathan - keyboards, piano
 Michael Rhodes - bass guitar
 Ilya Toshinsky - banjo, bouzouki, dobro, acoustic guitar
 Jonathan Yudkin - fiddle

Chart performance

References

2011 albums
Carter's Chord albums
Show Dog-Universal Music EPs
Albums produced by Mark Wright (record producer)